Ernest Webnje Nfor (born 28 April 1986 in Cameroon), known as Nfor, is a Cameroonian professional footballer, who currently plays for Belgian club KSV Temse as a striker.

Career

Belgium
In January 2006 he started playing KAA Ghent, coming from Sable Batié. He was hardly playing opportunities, and the following season he was loaned to KMSK Deinze. During the 2007–08 season he was loaned to KV Kortrijk. After that season AA Gent wanted to take him back into the first team.
Nfor played half a season at Ghent, but could not completely break in first class. Gent decided to loan him out again. KV Kortrijk and Zulte Waregem competed for Nfor services, Zulte Waregem drew the longest straw and hired the striker initially until the end of the season. After Zulte-Waregem Player Mbaye Leye AA Gent departed Nfor was adopted definitively by SV Zulte Waregem.

For the 2010-2011 he returned to his former club KV Kortrijk, and signed  on May 19, 2011 a contract for three years. He became a regular player during the 2011–2012 season and won the Kortrijk Golden Boot, a prize awarded by the supporters.

Geox
Along with fellow Cameroonian footballer Aloys Nong, Nfor is sponsored by Geox, the shoe that breathes.

Azerbaijan
In August 2013, Nfor moved to the Azerbaijan Premier League with then reigning champions Neftchi Baku. In the first season they won the Cup. Nfor's 2-year contract with Neftchi Baku ended in August 2015 and he left the club after ending his contract.

Saudi Arabia 
Since January 2016 he joined Al-Wehda Mecca of Saudi Arabia. He played 8 matches and scored 3 goals against Alhilal, Ittihad, and Alraed in the  Saudi Professional League.

Back to Belgium
After five months in Malta, playing for Birkirkara, he moved back to Belgium in January 2018 and joined Dender. He then moved to K. Olsa Brakel in October 2018, before he moved to KSV Temse.

Sediment

He has made several comments about "sediment" in public post-match interviews.

Career statistics

References

External links
 
 
 

1986 births
Living people
Cameroonian footballers
Cameroonian expatriate footballers
K.A.A. Gent players
S.V. Zulte Waregem players
K.V. Kortrijk players
K.M.S.K. Deinze players
Al-Wehda Club (Mecca) players
Birkirkara F.C. players
F.C.V. Dender E.H. players
Belgian Pro League players
Challenger Pro League players
Maltese Premier League players
Saudi Professional League players
Persian Gulf Pro League players
Azerbaijan Premier League players
Expatriate footballers in Belgium
Expatriate footballers in Saudi Arabia
Expatriate footballers in Iran
Expatriate footballers in Azerbaijan
Expatriate footballers in Malta
Association football forwards
Neftçi PFK players
Cameroon international footballers
Cameroonian expatriate sportspeople in Azerbaijan